"Wona" is a song by English rock band Mumford & Sons, Baaba Maal, The Very Best and Beatenberg. It was released as the second single from their extended play, Johannesburg, on 13 June 2016.

Track listing

Chart performance

Release history

References

2016 singles
2016 songs
Mumford & Sons songs